The RWD 16bis and RWD 21 were Polish two-seat low-wing touring and sports planes of the late 1930s, constructed by the RWD bureau, sharing the same construction, main difference of the RWD 21 being a stronger engine.

Development
The RWD 16bis was designed in 1938 by Andrzej Anczutin of the RWD bureau as a light and economical touring and sports plane, utilizing the experience from an unsuccessful earlier design RWD 16. In  spite of the designation, the RWD 16bis design was new, only partly basing on the RWD 16 construction. On contrary, it appeared a successful design, with good handling and performance and ease of flying. It was a wooden low-wing monoplane, with two seats side-by-side in a closed cockpit.

The first prototype was built and first flown in June–July 1938 (registration SP-BNM) followed by the second prototype (SP-BPC). Both were powered by a Polish-designed 63 hp Avia 3 straight engine. In series, a 62 hp Walter Mikron II straight engine was expected. The LOPP paramilitary organization ordered 20 aircraft, the first were to be built by May 1939. Probably a few were completed by the outbreak of the World War II, but there are no evidences.

The RWD 21 was a development variant with a stronger 90 hp engine Cirrus Minor and some minor changes, mostly to a canopy. The prototype was flown in February 1939 (registration SP-BPE). The first series of 10 aircraft was ordered and at least six were completed and registered before the war outbreak (SP-BRE, BRF, BRG, BRH, BRM, KAR)

Operational history
Both aircraft were found by the LOPP paramilitary organization as successful economical planes, suitable for the plan of subsidising the development of private aviation in Poland. A series of RWD 16bis was ordered by the LOPP at a price of 17,800 złoty (including the engine 6,200 zł), in order to sell airframes to private owners for 9,500 zł (the price of a mid-class car), lending them engines. The price of the RWD 21 was 20,500 zł (including the engine 8,000 zł).

At the outbreak of World War II, one RWD 21 was owned by Wilno Aero Club (SP-BRF), three by the LOPP (SP-BRE, BRG, BRH), one by private owner (SP-KAR) and two remained in the factory (SP-BPE, BRM). After the German invasion on Poland, in September 1939, two RWD 21s (SP-BPE and BRM) were evacuated from the factory to Romania (one of them by a glider pilot Bronisław Żurakowski, who had not flown a plane before). At least one of them (SP-BPE) was used in Romania with markings YR-VEN and returned to Poland after the war. It was next used until the mid-1950s with new markings SP-AKG. It is currently restored and preserved in the Polish Aviation Museum in Kraków.

One RWD 21 was evacuated to Latvia, its further fate is unknown.

Description
Wooden construction low-wing cantilever monoplane, conventional in layout, with a fixed landing gear and a closed cockpit. Fuselage semi-monocoque, plywood-covered, duralumin in front engine section. Single-part trapezoid wings with rounded tips, two-spar, plywood (in front) and canvas covered, fitted with split flaps. Conventional cantilever empennage, plywood (fins) and canvas (elevators and rudder) covered. Two seats side-by-side, with twin controls, under a canopy, with a fixed windshield. Behind a cockpit, a place for a baggage. Conventional fixed landing gear with a rear skid, the main gear in covers. 4-cylinder straight engine in front, driving a two-blade fixed pitch Szomański wooden propeller, with a  fuel tank in the centre-section, under the crew seats.

Operators

Royal Romanian Air Force

Specifications (RWD-21)

See also

References

External links

Photos and drawings at Ugolok Neba

1930s Polish sport aircraft
1930s Polish civil utility aircraft
RWD aircraft
Low-wing aircraft
Single-engined tractor aircraft
Aircraft first flown in 1938